Indian Charlie (March 27, 1995 – December 15, 2011) was an American Thoroughbred racehorse who won the 1998 Grade 1 Santa Anita Derby, equaling the stakes record time, before finishing third in the Kentucky Derby in his final start. He is best known as an important sire of Champions, and his son Uncle Mo was the leading freshman sire of 2015.

Racing career
Indian Charlie won his first four races, including a  length victory over Real Quiet in the Santa Anita Derby, equaling the stakes record of 1:47 flat. He started at odds of 5/2 for the Kentucky Derby, in which he finished third to Real Quiet. He was rested after the Derby and missed the Preakness and Belmont Stakes. He was being prepared for a return to racing in the Haskell Invitational in August when he pulled a suspensory ligament during training at Del Mar Racetrack and was retired from racing.

Stud record
Indian Charlie entered stud at Vinery in Central Kentucky for a $10,000 fee. As a freshman sire in 2002, he ranked in the top 10 by progeny earnings and was represented by one stakes winner. As a second-crop sire, he stayed in the top 10 by earnings but still needed that breakout runner.

Indian Charlie stood at Airdrie Stud near Midway, Kentucky where his stud fee for 2011 was set at $70,000. To date he has sired four champions:
 Fleet Indian, American Champion Older Female Horse (2006) multiple Grade 1 winner of $1.7 million
 Indian Blessing, won 2007 Breeders' Cup Juvenile Fillies, American Champion Two-Year-Old Filly (2007), American Champion Female Sprint Horse (2008), earned $2,995,420
 Indian Apple Is, 2010 Canadian Champion Female Sprint Horse
 Uncle Mo, won 2010 Breeders' Cup Juvenile, American Champion Two-Year-Old Colt. Leading freshman sire of 2015

Among his other notable progeny, Indian Charlie is the sire of multiple stakes winners A. P. Indian, Conveyance, Bwana Charlie, Indian Firewater, Iindyanne, Mr. Nightlinger, My Pal Charlie, Pampered Princess, Roxy Gap, Two Trail Sioux, Zada Belle, as well as 2011 Robert B. Lewis Stakes winner Anthony's Cross and Jerome Stakes winner Adios Charlie. 

Indian Charlie is the grandsire (through Uncle Mo) of Nyquist, American Champion Two-Year-Old Colt and winner of the 2016 Kentucky Derby.

For his career, Indian Charlie sired 83 black-type winners (8% from named foals of racing age) that included 29 graded/group winners and eight champions. His stud fee would climb to $75,000 by 2009 and his sales yearling average to more than $136,000.

As a broodmare sire, he's been represented by 15 stakes-producing daughters whose progeny have earned more than $31 million. From all his daughters, he has been represented by 93 black-type winners that include 31 graded/group winners and six champions. Hot Rod Charlie, as of November 1, 2022 is Indian Charlie's leading earner as a broodmare sire with $5,556,720 in lifetime earnings.

Indian Charlie was euthanized at Airdrie Stud on December 15, 2011. The sixteen-year-old had been battling cancer.

Pedigree
Indian Charlie has single-handedly revived the Caro sire line that is a branch from Nasrullah through English classic-placed stakes winner Grey Sovereign. The path to this revival began with Soviet Sojourn, a daughter of Leo Castelli that Earnhardt bought as a yearling for $14,000 at the 1990 Arizona Thoroughbred Breeders Association Fall Sale from Double D Thoroughbred Farms.

References

 Indian Charlie's pedigree and partial racing stats

1995 racehorse births
2011 racehorse deaths
Racehorses bred in California
Racehorses trained in the United States
Thoroughbred family 21-a